Grzegorz Lech (born 10 January 1983 in Kętrzyn) is a Polish retired footballer who played as a midfielder.

He retired in September 2020 and was named Stomil Olsztyn's chairman shortly after. He held his position until the end of the 2020–21 season.

References

External links
 

1983 births
Living people
People from Kętrzyn
Sportspeople from Warmian-Masurian Voivodeship
Association football midfielders
Polish footballers
OKS Stomil Olsztyn players
Ząbkovia Ząbki players
Korona Kielce players
Ekstraklasa players
I liga players